Sitana devakai (Devaka's fan-throated lizard) is an endemic species of agamid lizards recently found from Sri Lanka. The species was first found from Puttalama district.
The lizard is also known to found in Tamil Nadu of India, but not given valid identification. The species was named in honor of Dr. Devaka K. Weerakoon, who is a conservation biologist. He is a Professor of Zoology in University of Colombo.

Descriptions
The species was considered mainly as a subspecies or a color variation of much broader distributed Sitana ponticeriana. The lizard can be found in open scrub jungles.

Cited references

Other references
 Lanka newsline
 https://window2nature.wordpress.com/2015/03/

	

Sitana
Reptiles of Sri Lanka
Reptiles described in 2014